The 2016 Asia Cup Qualifier was a Twenty20 International (T20I) cricket tournament held in Bangladesh from 19 to 22 February 2016. The event served as a qualifier for the 2016 Asia Cup, which was held in the same country later in the month. The tournament was played as a round-robin, with the participants being the four Asian associate members of the International Cricket Council (ICC) with T20I status. The United Arab Emirates won all three of its matches, joining Bangladesh, India, Pakistan, and Sri Lanka in the main event.

Background and teams
The Asia Cup Qualifier was originally scheduled to be held in the United Arab Emirates in November 2015. However, following a scheduling conflict, it was later decided to move the event, with it now serving as a lead-in to the main tournament. In previous years where associates have participated in the Asia Cup, no standalone qualifier has been held, with teams instead qualifying via the ACC Trophy (2004, 2008) or by invitation (2014). Of the four teams, Oman made their Asia Cup debut.

Teams

Squads

Points table
{| class="wikitable" style="text-align:center"
|-
! Pos
!width="220"| Team
!width="20"| 
!width="20"| 
!width="20"| 
!width="20"| 
!width="20"| 
!width="20"| 
! 
|- style="background:#cfc;"
|1||style="text-align:left"|
| 3 || 3 || 0 || 0 || 0 || 6  || +1.678
|- style="background:#fcc;"
|2||style="text-align:left"|
| 3 || 2 || 1 || 0 || 0 || 4 || +0.954
|- style="background:#fcc;"
|3||style="text-align:left"|
| 3 || 1 || 2 || 0 || 0 || 2  || –1.222
|- style="background:#fcc;"
|4||style="text-align:left"|
| 3 || 0 || 3 || 0 || 0 || 0  || –1.416
|}
 Advance to 2016 Asia Cup

Matches

References

2016 Asia Cup
International cricket competitions in 2015–16
2016 in Bangladeshi cricket
International cricket competitions in Bangladesh